Ramaswamy Shreyas Gopal (born 4 September 1993) is an Indian cricketer who plays for Karnataka in domestic cricket. He is an all-rounder who bats right-handed, and bowls leg break. He played three ODIs for India Under-19 cricket team in 2011. He had captained Karnataka at various age levels such as Under-13, Under-15, Under-16 and Under-19.

Domestic career 
Gopal made his debut for Karnataka in 2013. On 12 February 2014, Gopal picked the first hat-trick in Irani Cup history against Rest of India, which helped Karnataka win the Irani Cup. In August 2019, he was named in the India Blue team's squad for the 2019–20 Duleep Trophy.

In October 2018, he was named in India A's squad for the 2018–19 Deodhar Trophy.

Indian Premier League 
He was bought by Mumbai Indians in the 2014 IPL auction, where he spent four seasons.

In January 2018, he was bought by the Rajasthan Royals in the 2018 IPL auction. On 30 April 2019, he took a hat-trick against Royal Challengers Bangalore in the 2019 Indian Premier League, which included the wickets of Virat Kohli, AB de Villiers and Marcus Stoinis. Shreyas Gopal picked up a hat-trick in the shortest IPL game ever.

In February 2022, he was bought by the Sunrisers Hyderabad in the auction for the 2022 Indian Premier League tournament.

Personal life
Shreyas Gopal studied at Frank Anthony Public School, Bangalore. He completed his Bcom (Bachelor of Commerce) from Jain University.

His father Ramaswamy Gopal was a club cricketer for 20 years while his mother Amitha played volleyball at state level. During his childhood he liked to copy the bowling action of his role model Anil Kumble.

References

External links
 
 Shreyas Gopal 's profile page on Wisden

Indian cricketers
Living people
1993 births
Karnataka cricketers
Cricketers from Bangalore
Mumbai Indians cricketers
India Green cricketers
Rajasthan Royals cricketers
Sunrisers Hyderabad cricketers